Merle Pertile (November 23, 1941 – February 21, 1997) was an American model and actress.  She was Playboy magazine's Playmate of the Month for its January 1962 issue.

Biography
Pertile was born on November 23, 1941, in Whittier, California and grew up in Indiana and Illinois. She attended and graduated from Hammond High School, Hammond, Indiana in 1959. Following graduation, she moved to Los Angeles, where she became a contract player with Universal Pictures and had guest spots on several TV shows.

During the second season of the Playboy's Penthouse TV series (1960–61), Pertile became a regular cast member. It was there that she first met Hugh Hefner.

According to The Playmate Book, Pertile died on November 28, 1997. She was married to Jed S. Levitt. She has a son, Krishna Joseph Levitt  and a daughter, Kenya Johanna Levitt. She died on February 21, 1997, in Lake Arrowhead, California. The cause of death was complications following heart surgery.

See also
 List of people in Playboy 1960–1969

References

External links
 
 
 

1941 births
1997 deaths
1960s Playboy Playmates
Actors from Whittier, California